The units and formations of the French Army which fought in the Algerian War changed over time.

The Algiers Division, Oran Division and Constantine Divisions were all retitled military divisions (or divisions militaires) on 17 March 1956. On March 8, 1957 all three divisions were upgraded to Army Corps (CA) with twelve sub-areas. They were again redesignated as territorial regions/army corps (regions territoriales et Corps d’Armees) in April 1959. After 1962 they were reduced solely to the functions of army corps once more, and then returned again to divisional status only.

Schrader lists as the divisions of the General Reserve the 10th and 25th Parachute Divisions at Algiers and Philippeville, and the 11th Infantry Division (France) at Bône. RT/CAO, the Oran Corps Area, with its headquarters at Oran, comprised the 5th Armoured Division (Mostaganem, North), 4th DIM (Tiaret, East Oran Zone), and 12th (Tlemcen, West Oran Zone), 13th (Mecheria, South Oran) and 29th Infantry Divisions (Sidi-bel-Abbes, Central Oran Zone) Infantry Divisions, plus the 102nd Light Aviation Group (102e GALAT) also at Sidi-bel-Abbes. RT/CAA, the Algiers Corps Area, comprised the 27th DIA (Tizi-Ouzou), and 9th and 20th Infantry Divisions (Orléansville and Médéa), East, West, and South Zones, with the 105th and 114th Army Light Aviation Groups. The Constantine Army Corps (RT/CAC) had five divisions: 2 DIM Bone, 7e Division Mechanique Rapide Tebessa, 14 & 19 DI respectively at Constantine and Setif, and the 21st Algerian Infantry Division at Batna. Also two GALATs.

In 1962, the French Army forces in Algeria were being supervised by the Commandement Supérieur des Forces Armées en Algérie with the Constantine, Algiers, and Oran Zones supervised by the 22nd, 23rd, and 24th Army Corps respectively.

This Kim Kanger sourced listing below is as of 1961.

Oran Zone 1961

Constantine Zone 1961

Algiers Zone 1961

General Reserve

Sahara

Aviation 
From the time before World War II French Algeria in regards to air force operations was in the Area of Responsibility of the 5th Air Force Region (5e région aérienne (5e RA)). The region covered the territories of French Northern Africa (Afrique française du Nord (AFN)), which included Algeria (incorporated into Metropolitan France) and the colonies (protectorates) of Morocco and Tunisia. Correspondingly the 5th AFR had three air force commands assigned to it: Air Algérie, Air Maroc and Air Tunisie. With Morocco and Tunisia gaining independence in 1956 the 5th AFR's AOR decreased to the territory of Algiers. The 5th AFR's command echelon included a staff (état-major) and three regional directorates: Administration (la direction régionale du commissariat, Medical (la direction régionale du service de santé) and Materiel (la direction régionale du matériel).

 Algeria Air Force Command (le commandement d’Air Algérie) - tactical command subordinated to the 5th Air Force Region
 units directly subordinated to the Algeria Air Force Command (fighters, bombers, recon aircraft, heavy transport aircraft)
 Tactical Aviation Groupment No. 1 (groupement aérien tactique n° 1 (GATAC n° 1)), air force command for the Constantine operational region
 Tactical Aviation Groupment No. 2 (groupement aérien tactique n° 2 (GATAC n° 2)), air force command for the Oran operational region
 Tactical Aviation Groupment No. 3 (groupement aérien tactique n° 3 (GATAC n° 3)), air force command for the Algiers operational region

Each GATAC had its own Territorial Support Brigade (brigade territoriale de soutien (BTS)) for logistical support. The three GATACs were further divided into operational zones (zones opérationnelles), each commanded  by an Air Force Command Post (poste de commandement air (PCA)). In 1959 the aviation assets in Algeria underwent a reorganization and the French Air Force took operational control over the Navy and Army aviation units in the war theatre. This created the army aviation's Light Aviation Support Groupments (groupements d’aviation légère d’appui).

Air Force Riflemen 

The Air Force also deployed its own ground regiments of the Fusiliers de l'air, which used the traditional French half-brigades (démi-brigades) unit type. They were formed between September 1955 and June 1956, relying heavily on officers and NCOs posted from the Army. These units were subordinated to the three GATACs. The infantry units of the Air Force were transferred to the Army by the end of 1957. 

 531e demi-brigade des fusiliers de l’air - based in Arba, Algiers sector
 532e demi-brigade des fusiliers de l’air - based in Saint-Denis du Sig, Oran sector
 533e demi-brigade des fusiliers de l’air - based in La Chiffa, Algiers sector
 541e demi-brigade des fusiliers de l’air - based in the Souk Ahras region, Constantine sector, the battalions were dispersed in 71 détachements in a rectangular area of 70 kms by 40 kms
 542e demi-brigade des fusiliers de l’air - based in Guelma, Constantine sector
 543e demi-brigade des fusiliers de l’air - based in Aïn Beïda, Sahara
 544e demi-brigade des fusiliers de l’air - initially formed in Tunisia, relocated to Algeria on October 10, 1956
 545e demi-brigade des fusiliers de l’air - initially formed in Tunisia, relocated to Algeria on October 10, 1956
 546e demi-brigade des fusiliers de l’air - based in Alma at the foothills of the Blida Atlas mountains
 547e demi-brigade des fusiliers de l’air - based in El Biar, Algiers sector

The command elements of the half-brigades (Unités à administration distincte (UAD)) actually belonged to the 5th Air Force Region's territorial administrative center (Centre administratif territorial de l'air (CATA) 860) in Blida and were attached to the infantry units.

The elite Parachute Commandos were retained at the central level of the 5th Air Force Region.

 :fr:Groupement des commandos parachutistes de l'air 00/541 (GCPA) - included four combat units and one support unit, all called 'commandos''':
 Commando de l'air 10/541 « Martel » (forerunner of today's commando parachutiste de l'air n° 10)
 Commando de l'air 20/541 « Manoir » (forerunner of today's commando parachutiste de l'air n° 20)
 Commando de l'air 30/541 « Maquis » formed by personnel from the Air Force units in Morocco (forerunner of today's commando parachutiste de l'air n° 30)
 Commando de l'air 40/541 « Maxime »

Each combat commando had an established strength of 102 men (5 officers, 22 NCOs and 75 ranks), but in the course of the war it could occasionally increase up to 180 men. The building block of the units was the Team (équipe) of 5 or 6 men. A Commando Group (groupe de commando) combined two teams for a total of 10 - 12 men, transportable by a single H-34 or two H-19 helicopters. A Commando Platoon (section de commando) combined two commando groups (total of four teams): two Command and Fire Teams (deux équipes de commandement et de feu) and two regular commando teams (deux équipes simples de commandos)

 Commando de l'air 50/541 - was the logistical support unit. The GCPA included a Separate Administrative Unit (unité à administration distincte (UAD)) of 55 men. On May 1, 1957 the UAD absorbed the logistical personnel from Commando de l'air 50/541 and formed the HQ of the formation - GCPA 00/541 « Norpois ». Later Commando 50 was repurposed as a combat commando.

Two experimental commandos of reduced strength were added later: 

 Commando expérimental « Chouf »
 Commando expérimental « Matou »

Due to their active involvement in the Algiers putsch of 1961 at the end of April all commandos were disbanded effective immediately. Personnel from Commando 10, 20 and 40 was dispersed between five air bases in metropolitan France - Dijon, Le Bourget, Toulouse, Istres and Caen. To fill up the void on May 1 two new units were formed at the BA 146 Reghaïa air base from personnel from Commando 30 and 50 and the men from the experimental commandos:

 compagnie de commandos parachutistes de l'air no 30.541 compagnie de commandos parachutistes de l'air no 50.541These units discarded the commando nomenclature in order to break with the previous units and the reason for their disbandment. The new companies also differed in their established structure with a strength of 5 officers, 33 NCOs and 100 ranks each.

 Notes 

 References 

Sources
 Kanger, Kim "Algerian Insurgency: End of the French Empire", in Strategy & Tactics'', No. 262 (May/June 2010)

External links 
gu-algerie - graphic depiction of Shrader 1999 information (generally)

Orders of battle
Algerian War